Oleksandriia is a city located in Oleksandriia Raion, Kirovohrad Oblast (region) in central Ukraine. Administratively, Oleksandriia serves as the administrative center of Oleksandriia Raion (district). Oleksandriia also hosts the administration of Oleksandriia urban hromada, one of the hromadas of Ukraine. 

In 2001, it had a population of 93,357, and including the villages (selo) and urban type settlements in the city municipality a population of 103,856.

History
The city is first mentioned in 1746, as the settlement Usivka. The official record of the settlement is dated 1754, when the Saint Elizabeth fortress was built in the region (today Kropyvnytskyi). During the establishment of the Russian colony of New Serbia in 1752–64, the 3rd Company of New Serbia was quartered in Usivka Pandurs. In place of Usivka the (sconce) Bechey (after the Serbian city of Bečej) encampment was established.

In 1764, New Serbia was liquidated, and Usykivka became part of the Elizabethan province of Novorossiya Governorate, which existed until 1783, when its territory was included in the Yekaterinoslav Viceroyalty. In 1784, the Russian government gave the settlement a Hellenic name of Aleksandriysk and later Aleksandriya (locally as Oleksandriya). In 1806–1922, Oleksandriya was a county (uyezd) seat.

In 1917, branches of the Ukrainian Free Cossacks appeared on the territory of Oleksandria. In May 1919, the city of Oleksandria was the center of an anti-Bolshevik uprising led by Otaman Nykyfor Hryhoriv. On 23 May 1919, the uprising was brutally suppressed by the forces of the Red Army.

On 6 August 1941, (during World War II) the Red Army of the Soviet Union left the city to the Nazi Germany Wehrmacht without fight. During the Nazi occupation, the city lost almost its entire Jewish population (est. ~2,500). The Nazi administration also executed over 5,500 Soviet prisoners of war as part of the Nazi stance on the issue of the Soviets not signing the 1929 Geneva Convention. The city was recovered by the Soviet armed forces on 6 December 1943.

Until 18 July 2020, Oleksandriia was designated as a city of oblast significance and belonged to Oleksandriia Municipality. It was the administrative center of Oleksandriia Raion even though it did not belong to the raion. As part of the administrative reform of Ukraine, which reduced the number of raions of Kirovohrad Oblast to four, Oleksandriia Municipality was merged into Oleksandriia Raion.

On 15 April 12022, at 10:26 p.m., two missiles hit the infrastructure of the city's airport.

Climate
Climate of Oleksandriia is classified as humid continental (Köppen classification: Dfb). Winter is cold and mild. Summer is hot. Coldest month is January (average temperature -5 °C), hottest month is July (average temperature 21.5 °C). With no dry season, winters are snowy and summers are rainy. The wettest month is June (66 mm), the driest is March (30 mm). Average annual precipitation is 526 mm.

Places of interest
A popular place to visit in the town is Oleksandriia's square, known as Soborna Square ("Соборна площа").

Twin towns
Oleksandriia is twinned with:

  Jarocin, Poland
  Xinyi, China
  Tervel, Bulgaria

People from Oleksandriia
 Yuriy Kravchenko, Ukrainian police officer and statesman (1951)
 Pyotr Koshevoy, Soviet military leader (1968)
 Leonid Popov, Soviet cosmonaut
 Sholom Secunda, Jewish-American composer (1894)
 Ihor Nenko, first Ukrainian and post Soviet Union athlete who swam across La Manche (English Channel)

See also 

 List of cities in Ukraine

References

Oleksandriia
Cities in Kirovohrad Oblast
Mining cities and regions in Ukraine
Cities of regional significance in Ukraine
Populated places established in 1754
1754 establishments in the Russian Empire
Aleksandriysky Uyezd
Holocaust locations in Ukraine